Josateki Tamudu (born 22 June 1991) is a Fijian footballer who plays as a defender for Fijian club Rewa and the Fiji national team.

Club career
Tamudu was born in Rewa and has played with them for his entire career. In 2017 he played with the club in the 2017 OFC Champions League

National team
Tamudu was first called up by coach Christophe Gamel in 2017 for the national football team. However he did not play for almost two years. He finally made his debut on March 18, 2019, in a 3–0 win against New Caledonia. He came in for Malakai Rakula in the 75th minute of play.

References

External links
 

Fijian footballers
Association football defenders
Rewa F.C. players
Fiji international footballers
Living people
1991 births